San Polo dei Cavalieri is a comune (municipality) in the Metropolitan City of Rome in the Italian region of Lazio, located about  northeast of Rome.

San Polo dei Cavalieri borders the following municipalities: Guidonia Montecelio, Licenza, Marcellina, Monteflavio, Palombara Sabina, Roccagiovine, Tivoli, Vicovaro.

References

Cities and towns in Lazio